Santiago–Rosalía de Castro Airport , previously named Lavacolla Airport and also known as Santiago de Compostela Airport, is an international airport serving the autonomous community and historical region of Galicia in Spain. It is the 2nd busiest airport in northern Spain after Bilbao Airport. It has been named after the Galician romanticist writer and poetess, Rosalía de Castro, since 12 March 2020.

The airport is located in the parish of Lavacolla, 12 km from Santiago de Compostela and handled 3,236,619 passengers in 2022. It is the focus city of Vueling in the northwest Iberian Peninsula, and Ryanair's only focus city in Northern Spain. The Christian pilgrimage route of the Camino de Santiago runs near the airport.

History
The airport was set up by a group of aviation enthusiasts in October 1932 and two months directors were chosen to select where the airport was going to be built. In 1935 construction work started at the airport where two years later on 27 September 1937 the first scheduled flight from Santiago de Compostela took place.  After the Spanish Civil war, political prisoners (who were held in the concentration camp of Lavacolla) were forced to work in the construction of the airport.

In 1969 a new terminal was built at the airport. It later underwent several expansions, including a remodeling in 1993. 

Iberia launched a seasonal link to New York City, the first transatlantic route from Santiago de Compostela, in June 1980. The carrier operated the flight with Boeing 747 aircraft. Four months later, Viasa added non-stop service to Caracas using McDonnell Douglas DC-10s. In 1981, a cargo terminal was built, giving the airport capacity to handle cargo flights. 

Viasa shut down in 1997, but Avensa resurrected the route to Caracas two years later. 

On 13 October 2011, a new passenger terminal opened at the airport.

Terminal
The airport currently has one operating terminal.  The old terminal at Santiago de Compostela airport opened in 1969 and was often expanded. The old terminal closed on the night of 13 October 2011 when operations transferred to the new terminal.

The new terminal at Santiago de Compostela Airport officially opened on 13 October 2011 and passenger operations transferred there the following day. It is adjacent to the old terminal and has a size of 74,000 sq m. It has 22 check-in desks, 3 security checkpoints, 4 baggage carousels, and 13 gates of which 5 have airbridges. The baggage hall is split into two zones, one for Schengen flights and one for Non-Schengen. It can handle as many as 4 million passengers per year. The terminal is due to be expanded in the future. This includes adding another five airbridges to five of the current gates as well as three more baggage carousels and an expanded shopping area.

Airlines and destinations
The following airlines operate regular scheduled and charter flights at Santiago–Rosalía de Castro Airport:

Statistics
During the early 2000s, numbers increased significantly at the airport, from 1.24 million in 2002 to peak at 2.46 million in 2011. Because of the financial crisis in Spain, those numbers decreased to 2.1 million in 2014. Cargo has decreased significantly over the last ten years. The Spanish economic recovery in the mid-2010s and the rise of Santiago de Compostela as an international destination are again increasing passenger numbers, breaking the 3 million mark for the first time in 2022.

Traffic figures by year

Traffic figures by month

Route statistics

Ground transportation

Road
The airport is linked with Santiago de Compostela (13 km) by the Autovía A-54. This motorway, although some sections are yet to be built and opened, also connects the airport with Lugo (94.5 km), where it connects with the Autovía A-6, providing toll-free motorway access to the rest of Spain; and to the French border through the Autovía A-8 that intersects with the Autovía A-6 near Lugo. Nearby Autopista AP-9 connects the airport directly to A Coruña (66 km), Ferrol (88 km), Pontevedra (75 km), Vigo (100 km) and the Portuguese border. Ourense (116 km) is reachable through the Autopista AP-53 that connects with the Autopista AP-9.

There are several major car rental companies at the airport. The airport has more than 5,000 short and long-term covered parking spaces in the new terminal building. In addition, there are several low-cost, long-term private parking facilities around the airport.

Bus services
A city bus service connects the airport with the center of Santiago de Compostela and the bus and train terminal in the city regularly. From the station in Santiago de Compostela, private coach operators run direct services in a multiple daily basis to most cities and towns in Galicia, including A Coruña, Ferrol, Lugo, Ourense, Pontevedra and Vigo, as well as long-distance services to the rest of Spain, and international services. In addition, three regional services link the airport directly to A Coruña, to Lugo, including several stops in the French Way of the Camino de Santiago, and to the A Mariña coastal area (home to As Catedrais beach) in the province of Lugo.

Rail
There are no rail facilities at the airport. However, the train station in Santiago de Compostela, located 12 km. away, is connected to the airport by the city bus service every 30 minutes. There are combined available train+bus tickets to and from the airport. The train station in Santiago de Compostela has regional, medium and long-distance high-speed Alvia services to most cities in Galicia, including A Coruña, Ferrol, Ourense, Pontevedra, Vilagarcía and Vigo; and further to Madrid Chamartín and the rest of Spain.

Foot and bike
The Camino de Santiago runs next to the runway of the airport. This is the busiest and final journey in the Camino de Santiago that goes through the famous Monte do Gozo. There are dedicated pathways for both pedestrians and bikers towards the city. The walking distance from the runway to the Cathedral is estimated at 10.90 km.

Accidents and Incidents
On 3 March 1978, a McDonnell Douglas DC-8-63 operated by Iberia from Madrid–Barajas Airport with 211 passengers and 11 crew members, registration EC-BMX. The aircraft touched down far down the runway after a high approach, aquaplaned off the runway, dropped into a hollow 20m deep and caught fire. The crash was settled with 70 injured people, 10 of them seriously injured, and no fatalities.
On 7 June 2001, a Beechcraft B300C Super King Air 350, registration F-GOAE, departed from Le Mans-Arnage Airport (LME), France, to Santiago De Compostela Airport (SCQ), Spain, on a cargo flight according to instrument flight rules. Near the destination airport, the meteorological conditions were reported to be good, and the crew requested a visual approach to runway 17, even though the active runway was 35. Once cleared to land, the aircraft encountered a fog patch and from this moment it began a high ate descent (2000 to 3000 ft/min). A minute after entering an unexpected and unforeseen fog patch, the aircraft struck some trees in level flight and with an airspeed of 148 kt. The wings and engines detached from the fuselage, and they dragged along a scrubland area until they came to a stop. The crew suffered minor injuries and the aircraft was completely destroyed.
On 2 August 2012, an Airnor Cessna 500 Citation I, registration EC-IBA, flying from Asturias crashed whilst on approach to the airport with the loss of both crew members.

References

External links

 Official website

Buildings and structures in Santiago de Compostela
Airports in Galicia (Spain)
Santiago de Compostela
Airports established in 1935